Kristleifur Björnsson is an Icelandic visual artist born in Reykjavík, Iceland in 1973. He graduated from HGB – Academy of Visual Arts in Leipzig, (Germany) in 2003.

Kristleifur's work has been exhibited in solo and group exhibitions throughout Europe in art museums and galleries such as Berlinische Galerie in Berlin, The Reykjavík Art Museum and The Tate Modern in London. He lives and works in Berlin, Germany.

References

Notes

Further reading 
 "Interview with Kristleifur Björnsson in Winterthur on April 5th, 2007" by Thomas Seelig.
  "Contagious Affairs" by Reinhard Braun, January 2010.
 "Icelandic Artists" at Center for Icelandic Art (CIA).

External links 
 Kristleifur Björnsson official website.
 Kristleifur Björnsson at Stalke Gallery.
 Kristleifur Björnsson at Gallery Poulsen.

1973 births
Living people
Icelandic contemporary artists
20th-century Icelandic male artists
21st-century Icelandic male artists